German submarine U-704 was a Type VIIC U-boat of Nazi Germany's Kriegsmarine during World War II.

Commissioned on 18 November 1941 under the command of Kapitänleutnant Horst Wilhelm Kessler, U-704 carried out training operations as part of the 8th U-boat Flotilla until 30 June 1942.

Design
German Type VIIC submarines were preceded by the shorter Type VIIB submarines. U-704 had a displacement of  when at the surface and  while submerged. She had two shafts and two  propellers.

U-704 was fitted with five  torpedo tubes (four fitted at the bow and one at the stern), fourteen torpedoes, one  SK C/35 naval gun, 220 rounds, and a  C/30 anti-aircraft gun. The boat had a complement of between forty-four and sixty.

Service history
U-704 set out on its first patrol, a transit to its operational base at Saint-Nazaire on 30 June 1942. During this patrol, U-704 formed part of wolfpack "Wolf" which was to patrol between Iceland and Greenland, out of the range of allied air cover. On 26 July 1942, U-704 torpedoed the  British freighter Empire Rainbow, part of convoy Convoy ON-113.

U-704 carried out a further four operational patrols under the command of Kessler from Saint Nazaire and La Pallice, sinking no further ships. U-704 did fire four torpedoes at the troopship Queen Elizabeth on 9 November 1942, with Kessler claiming a hit, although Queen Elizabeth was undamaged.

Fate
U-704 then served as a training submarine in the Baltic sea for the rest of the war, and was scuttled at Vegesack on 30 April 1945.

Wolfpacks
U-704 took part in seven wolfpacks, namely:
 Wolf (13 – 31 July 1942) 
 Pirat (31 July – 3 August 1942) 
 Steinbrinck (3 – 11 August 1942) 
 Panther (10 – 20 October 1942) 
 Veilchen (20 October – 7 November 1942) 
 Habicht (10 – 19 January 1943) 
 Haudegen (19 January – 9 February 1943)

Summary of raiding history

References

Bibliography

External links

German Type VIIC submarines
U-boats commissioned in 1941
1941 ships
Ships built in Hamburg
World War II submarines of Germany
Operation Regenbogen (U-boat)
Maritime incidents in May 1945